Huang Ching-yin (born 10 June 1992), nicknamed Hsueh-chieh, is a councilor representing Taipei City Constituency I on the Taipei City Council. A native of Taipei and a member of the Taiwan People's Party, Huang was formerly a reporter for online news outlet . She was previously responsible for managing social media for former Mayor of Taipei Ko Wen-je, and served as a deputy spokesperson for the Taipei City Government. In 2020, she ran as a Taiwan People's Party candidate for legislator-at-large in the Legislative Yuan. Huang was elected to the Taipei City Council in November 2022, coming first in a field of 25 candidates for Taipei City Constituency I, which includes the northern Taipei districts of Beitou District and Huang's hometown of Shilin District.

Early life 
Huang was born on 10 June 1992 and raised in Tianmu in the Shilin District of Taipei. Her family is of modest means; her father founded a small business selling wire, while her mother worked as an accountant. She has one younger brother. While at Minglun High School, Huang was a member of the mass communication club, and began to be interested in journalism and the mass media.

Huang's parents hoped that she would study finance or business management, or become a flutist or a civil servant, but her rebellious personality led her to study journalism, completing her undergraduate degree at Fu Jen Catholic University. Although her father made sure that she declare subjects such as finance or business management as her choices to study at university, Huang also insisted on choosing journalism; based on her university entrance exam results, she ended up qualifying to study journalism. Huang also has a master's degree from the Department of Media, Communications and Cultural Studies at Goldsmiths' College, University of London.

While studying at the Department of Journalism & Communication Studies at Fu Jen Catholic University, Huang originally wanted to be a newscaster, but later decided that she would be more suited to being a reporter. Huang aspired to be a sports reporter, but was unsuccessful in finding a position, despite applying for several such roles. After an introduction by a senior classmate, Huang began working the political news beat for online media, thus beginning her association with politics.

Huang's first media appearance was in 2013, when, as a student, she appeared briefly in a street interview by Lucifer Chu in Taipei about the Top Ten Villains of the year.

Political career

Parliamentary assistant 
Huang's first job in politics was as a parliamentary assistant to Democratic Progressive Party legislator Su Chiao-hui. In this role, she was responsible for Su Chiao-hui's social media accounts, including on Facebook.

Taipei City Government 
Due to her strong English language skills, she was assigned to run Ko Wen-je's Twitter account. Within three months, she succeeded in increasing the number of followers of the account by 50,000. In her early days working for the Taipei City Government, Ko Wen-je gave her the nickname "short and small girl".

In July 2018, Huang was featured in a video titled "A Day in the Life of Mayor Advisors feat. Ko Wen-je", episode 69 in the "A Day in the Life of" series from  streaming show . After the show was posted to YouTube, it became a popular topic for discussion by netizens, and became the hottest YouTube video of the week in Taiwan. In the video, Huang played the part of "Hsueh-chieh", leading the show's host, Andy Tai Chih-yuan, in experiencing a day in the life of a staffer in the office of the Mayor of Taipei. Huang only ended up appearing on the show because she was spotted by the show's producer walking past the open door of a meeting room in which the show was being planned. Due to her good looks and winsome personality, Huang unexpectedly became the center of much attention online and in the media.

On 25 December 2018, as a result of Ko Wen-je's successful campaign for re-election as mayor, Huang and  became deputy spokespeople for the Taipei City Government, assisting spokesperson Liu I-ting. From 27 March 2019, Huang began hosting the Taipei Broadcasting Station program "Taipei Progressive".

In 2019, Huang resigned from her role at the city government to run for election as a Taiwan People's Party legislator-at-large in the Legislative Yuan. Ko Wen-je referred to Huang as being able to vacuum up votes for the Taiwan People's Party, and she campaigned actively for other candidates on the party ticket.

Huang was not elected to the Legislative Yuan, due to being too far down the Taiwan People's Party proportional representation party list, and, in February 2020, she was reappointed as a deputy spokesperson for the Taipei City Government.

In November 2021, Huang left her role as a deputy spokesperson for the Taipei City Government and joined the staff of then Deputy Mayor of Taipei Huang Shan-shan (no relation).

2020 legislative election 
On 6 August 2019, the Taiwan People's Party was established, with Huang as a founding member. On 19 November 2019, the Taiwan People's Party issued its party list of candidates for the role of legislator-at-large; Huang appeared as the thirteenth name on a list of 28, a position that was not high enough on the list to secure her election to the Legislative Yuan in 2020.

Taipei City Council elections 
Huang Ching-yin resigned from her position on the staff of then Deputy Mayor of Taipei Huang Shan-shan to run for election to the Taipei City Council, running on the Taiwan People's Party ticket. Huang was one of two Taiwan People's Party candidates running in Taipei City Constituency I, which includes the northern Taipei districts of Beitou District and Huang's hometown of Shilin District.

At the beginning of 2022, the Taiwan People's Party faced a dilemma concerning its nominations to run for the Taipei City Constituency I of Beitou District and Shilin District in the elections for the Taipei City Council. It was thought at the time that if the Taiwan People's Party made two nominations for the constituency, it might split the Taiwan People's Party vote and make it difficult for either candidate to win election. However, the competition between Huang and fellow Taiwan People's Party member  was fierce, and neither of them wanted to withdraw, resulting in a deadlock; the Taiwan People's Party therefore put both forward for election.

It was reported in October 2022 that in her financial disclosure Huang stated that she did not have cash or real estate, but that she owned a Nissan Tiida compact car worth TWD650,000. She reported having savings of TWD413,000 and shares worth TWD91,000, for a total of TWD504,000. However, she also declared debts of TWD571,000 after studying abroad, giving her a net worth of negative TWD67,000, excluding the value of her car.

On 26 November 2022, Huang came first in a field of 25 candidates for Taipei City Constituency I, winning 29,270 votes (10.63%) to secure one of the 12 seats up for election. Fellow Taiwan People's Party candidate  was not elected.

Personal life 
Huang has spoken of the difficulties that arose in her personal life when she shot to fame as a result of appearing on the  show on YouTube, including not being accustomed to being a public figure or being recognized on the street. While still in her twenties, Huang overnight became the subject of intense media attention, and discovered that she was often followed and photographed by paparazzi even when not at work.

She has been open about the challenges of trying not to lose her warmth for people despite coming under frequent attack. She has also spoken of the negative effects of online comments about her, including concerning her appearance, stating that she has often been called a "yellow flower vase" online, but that she has no intention of changing herself because of such comments.

Cultural and political image 
Sources including the BBC have commented on the various phenomena related to Huang, and the societal and political trends reflected in her career and her media image. As politicians in Taiwan and globally struggle to establish their relevance in the eyes of younger voters, Huang's expertise in managing social media in a manner relatable to young people has been widely recognized. Huang's career is a case study in and reflects the necessity of winning the online space in politics and in public discourse, particularly when working for a political party facing a vast asymmetry of resources when compared with established parties - or when trying to disseminate messages to the populace on behalf of a local government body competing in a varied and boisterous media environment. The allure of Huang's youth and physical attractiveness has been commented on both positively and negatively, while Huang's sudden popularity and sustained media interest in her over several years have been said to reflect a trend towards seeing politics as a never-ending variety show or treating it as entertainment.

References 

Living people
1992 births
21st-century Taiwanese women politicians
Politicians of the Republic of China on Taiwan from Taipei
Taiwan People's Party politicians
Taiwanese women journalists
Fu Jen Catholic University alumni
Alumni of Goldsmiths, University of London
Pages using collapsible list with both background and text-align in titlestyle